Almops was, in Greek mythology, a giant  son of the god Poseidon and the half-nymph Helle. He was the brother of Paeon (called "Edonus" in some accounts).

It is from Almops that the now-obsolete name for the region of Almopia and its inhabitants, the Almopes, in Macedonia, Greece, were believed to have derived their name.

Notes

References 

 Stephanus of Byzantium, Stephani Byzantii Ethnicorum quae supersunt, edited by August Meineike (1790-1870), published 1849. A few entries from this important ancient handbook of place names have been translated by Brady Kiesling. Online version at the Topos Text Project.

Greek giants
Children of Poseidon
Family of Athamas
Mythology of Macedonia (region)